Camille Hilaire (2 August 1916 – 7 June 2004) was a French painter and weaver from Metz. He attended the École des Beaux-Arts in Paris during World War II and was also tutored by André Lhote.

Career
Hilaire began painting from a young age. Already at fifteen, he discovered the work of Albrecht Dürer in the Metz city library and began making copies of it. Some drawings he had hung up in a bookshop drew the attention of Jean Giono and Nicolas Untersteller, the director of the École des Beaux-Arts in Paris. It was thus that he enrolled at Beaux-Arts.

Thanks to a scholarship, Hilaire travelled around Spain and Italy in 1933 and 1934 and drew inspiration from the art he encountered. Both his painting and tapestry express the beauty and diversity of the places through which he travelled.

He was drafted into the army and participated in the campaign of France, was taken prisoner, escaped and returned to Paris in early 1941. Condemned to secrecy, he enrolled under a false name at the École des Beaux-Arts in Paris during the Occupation.

In 1942–1943, while remaining at Beaux-Arts, he also came under the tutelage of the Cubist artist André Lhote, with whom he became friends, and soon after his assistant. Hilaire's painting reveals influences from Cubism but without the rigidity typical of the early years of the movement.

He was then appointed professor of Beaux-Arts in Nancy, where he taught from 1947 to 1958, and then Paris until 1968.

He was awarded the Prix de Venise in 1948 and the Prix de la Casa de Velázquez in 1950.

He held his first exhibition in Paris in 1951 at the Gallerie Valloton. He then exhibited at the preeminent international art fairs in Geneva, Cannes and Deauville.

Camille Hilaire is subtle in his composition. He did away with efficient structures, he held power with colour and achieved a wonderful, consistent sense of calm, amplitude and greatness by translating patterns and elements, which never prevented him from expressing a burning passion for creating and sharing. His nudes were remarkable, with perfect curves, coiled with charm and set in a context in which their sensual fullness imposed itself with provocative grace. As for his landscapes, Camille Hilaire could determine the structure without apparent constraints, overlaying a fresh, spicy green that is so characteristic of them. Thus, nature and elements they become the pretext upon which the artist "pushed" the colour to get the effect felt. As for his tapestries, his job as a graphic designer and his willingness to explore are mingled in splendid works that draw attention by virtue of their technical execution of pure harmony and that have just as surprising an outcome as the artist's lithographs.

It was saved during modernization of the building.

Over time, a dozen monographs have been devoted to him as well as documentaries and films. He leaves behind a large body of work, stamped with the seal of seduction. Hilaire has strongly influenced the French painters of the mid-twentieth century.

Personal life

He was married in 1934 to Anne-Marie Reslinger, with whom he had a daughter, Jeannine. In 1942, he remarried with Simone Jance, a fellow student of art, with whom he had four children: Christiane, Pascale, Claude, a painter going by the name of Hastaire, and Florence, painter and sculptor with the pseudonym Cantié-Kramer.

Works

Illustrated books
From 1972 to 1994, Hilaire produced six limited edition books containing original lithographs: 
1972: Femmes 
1974: Le Cirque 
1975: Où passent nos rivières 
1976: La Normandie 
1977: Jardins 
1994: Méditerranéennes 
 Hilaire made twelve illustrations for this, the fifth of the six volumes of Chefs-d'oeuvre de Pierre Louÿs.

Tapestries

References

Bibliography

Further reading

External links
http://www.galerie125.fr/manufacturer/hilaire-camille - Galerie125 - Exposition Camille HILAIRE et Interview AUDIO
http://www.camillehilaire.fr - Le site officiel du peintre Camille Hilaire
http://www.whoswho.fr/decede/biographie-camille-hilaire_6394 Who's Who in France
http://www.estrepublicain.fr/art-et-culture/2013/01/18/les-trente-glorieuses-de-l-art#jimage=E30EEE26-B982-4F61-BBDB-50C6DCC95596

20th-century French painters
French male painters
21st-century French painters
1916 births
2004 deaths
Artists from Metz
École des Beaux-Arts alumni